Born Funky Born Free is the debut album from Australian singer/songwriter Loene Carmen. It was independently released in 2002 on Chiquita Records in Australia. It was recorded in Carmen's home studio, Loose Connections, in Darlinghurst, NSW and mixed and mastered at BJB Studios by Chris Townend.

Personnel
Loene Carmen - vocals, guitar, organ, beats
Cathy Green - bass, vocals
Simon Day - guitar
James Cruickshank - guitar, organ
Krystina - guitar

Track listing
 "Born Funky Born Free" (3:39)
 "My Friends Call Me Foxy" (4:24)
 "Rock On" (4:56)
 "Half Girl Half Beast" (4:41)
 "Chiquita Dub" (3:25)
 "Girl You Feel Alright To Me" (4:47)
 "The Doctor" (3:48)
 "I've Got Those Tickets You Wanted" (3:28)
 "The Green Ray" (4:09)
 "Gemini" (3:51)
 "Drag the River" (4:15)
 "White Wine & Cigarettes (Rest Hard)" (2:42)
 "How Close Are You?" (4:24)

Carmen states this album was inspired by funk pioneer Betty Davis. "I called my first album Born Funky Born Free in some kind of homage to Betty (Davis), and wrote a song from her imagined point of view called My Friends Call Me Foxy. Performing it always makes me stand up a little straighter."

"Mainly it was just me alone with headphones on, in my own little world..."

References

2002 debut albums
Loene Carmen albums